Iobenzamic acid is a pharmaceutical drug used as an X-ray contrast agent.

See also
 Iodinated contrast

References

Radiocontrast agents
Iodoarenes
Benzanilides
Propionamides